The 1955 Drake Bulldogs football team was an American football team that represented Drake University as an independent during the 1955 college football season. Led by seventh-year head coach Warren Gaer, the Bulldogs compiled a record of 4–4.

Schedule

References

Drake
Drake Bulldogs football seasons
Drake Bulldogs football